The 2nd South Indian International Movie Awards were presented on September 12–13, 2013 in Sharjah, UAE, to honour the best cinematic achievements of the South Indian film industry in the year 2012. Initially planned for June 20–21, the date was postponed due to "100 years of Indian cinema" jubilee festivities. The ceremony was hosted by Arya, Shriya Saran, Rana Daggubati and Sonu Sood at the Expo Centre Sharjah, while the "Generation Next Awards Night" was hosted a day before by Parvathy Omanakuttan and Ash Chandler. Differing from the 1st SIIMA Awards, technical Awards were presented on the first day as well. Show performances were delivered by Shruthi Haasan, Hansika Motwani, Shriya Saran, Rima Kallingal, Usha Uthup, Pranitha Subhash, Anirudh Ravichander, Ragini Dwivedi, Aindrita Ray, Andrea Jeremiah, Parul Yadav, Remya Nambeesan, Lakshmi Menon, Regina Cassandra and Meera Nandan.

Five new award categories were added for the 2nd SIIMA Awards ceremony: Best Debutant Producer, Best Actor in a Supporting Role, Best Actress in a Supporting Role, Best Fight Choreographer and Best Dance Choreographer. The organizers also introduced a Critics' Award in all lead actor and actress categories, raising the total sum of handed over awards to 94.

Nominated by a team of veteran professionals the final winners were decided by a public voting system. The most nominations were announced for the Telugu film Gabbar Singh (13), while in Tamil 3, Kumki and Thuppakki started with ten nominations each. Anna Bond (Kannada, 10) and Spirit (Malayalam, 9) were also favourites at the 2nd SIIMA Awards. Overall, 43 films were awarded at least one SIIMA Award. Out of these, Gabbar Singh (6 awards), Addhuri (5), Kumki, Thuppakki (4 each), 3, Eega, Anna Bond, Spirit and Thattathin Marayathu (3 each) were awarded more than two times. For their contributions as leading actresses in South Indian cinema Trisha and Kavya Madhavan were each bestowed with an honorary award. K. J. Yesudas and Sowcar Janaki were honoured with the SIIMA Lifetime Achievement Award.

Honorary awards

Lifetime Achievement Award 
K. J. Yesudas
Sowcar Janaki

Special appreciation 
 Kavya Madhavan
 Trisha

Main awards

Film

Acting 
{| class="wikitable" |
|-
! colspan="2" ! style="background:#eedd82; width:3000px; text-align:center;"|Best Actor
|-
! ! style="background:#efac00; width:50%; text-align:center;"|Tamil
! ! style="background:#efeb00; width:50%; text-align:center;"|Telugu
|-
| valign="top" |
Dhanush – 3Vijay Sethupathi – Pizza (Critics Award)
Vijay – Thuppakki
Vishnu – Neerparavai
Suriya – Maattrraan
| valign="top" |Pawan Kalyan – Gabbar SinghRana Daggubati – Krishnam Vande Jagadgurum (Critics Award)
Mahesh Babu – BusinessmanNagarjuna – Shirdi SaiAllu Arjun – JulaiRam Charan – Racha|-
! ! style="background:#00def3; text-align:center;"| Kannada
! ! style="background:#4df300; text-align:center;"| Malayalam
|-
|
Shivarajkumar – Shiva
Upendra – Katariveera Surasundarangi (Critics Award)
Darshan – Krantiveera Sangolli RayannaPuneeth Rajkumar – Anna BondDuniya Vijay – Bheema Theeradalli| 
Mohanlal – Spirit
Fahadh Faasil – Diamond Necklace (Critics Award)
Prithviraj – Ayalum Njanum ThammilLal – OzhimuriManoj K. Jayan – Ardhanaari|-
! colspan="2" ! style="background:#eedd82; text-align:center;"|Best Actress
|-
! ! style="background:#efac00; text-align:center;"|Tamil
! ! style="background:#efeb00; text-align:center;"|Telugu
|-
| valign="top" |
Hansika Motwani – Oru Kal Oru Kannadi
Kajal Aggarwal – Thuppakki (Critics Award)
Amala Paul – Kadhalil Sodhappuvadhu YeppadiShruti Haasan – 3Samantha Ruth Prabhu – Neethane En Ponvasantham| valign="top" |
Shruti Haasan – Gabbar Singh
Nayantara – Krishnam Vande Jagadgurum (Critics Award)
Kajal Aggarwal – BusinessmanTamannaah – RachaSamantha Ruth Prabhu – Eega|-
! ! style="background:#00def3; text-align:center;"| Kannada
! ! style="background:#4df300; text-align:center;"| Malayalam
|-
|
Priyamani – Chaarulatha
Ragini Dwivedi – Shiva (Critics Award)
Pranitha Subhash – Bheema TheeradalliRamya – SidlinguRadhika Pandit – Addhuri| 
Amala Paul – Run Baby Run
Rima Kallingal – 22 Female Kottayam (Critics Award)
Kavya Madhavan – Bavuttiyude NamathilSwetha Menon – Ithra MathramRevathi – Molly Aunty Rocks!|-
! colspan="2" ! style="background:#eedd82; text-align:center;"|Best Actor in a Supporting Role
|-
! ! style="background:#efac00; text-align:center;"|Tamil
! ! style="background:#efeb00; text-align:center;"|Telugu
|-
| valign="top" |
R. Madhavan – Vettai
Prakash Raj – DhoniThambi Ramaiah – SaattaiSatyaraj – NanbanPonvannan – Neerparavai| valign="top" |
Rajendra Prasad – Julai
Prakash Raj – DhamarukamKota Srinivasa Rao – Krishnam Vande JagadgurumAjay – IshqNassar – Businessman|-
! ! style="background:#00def3; text-align:center;"| Kannada
! ! style="background:#4df300; text-align:center;"| Malayalam
|-
|
Rangayana Raghu – Romeo
Ambareesh – DramaYogi – Yaare KoogadaliDoddanna – Katari Veera SurasundarangiRaghu Mukherjee – Dandupalya| 
Nandhu – Spirit
Prathap K. Pothan – Ayalum Njanum ThammilThilakan † – Ustad HotelSunny Wayne – Second ShowThalaivasal Vijay – Karmayogi|-
! colspan="2" ! style="background:#eedd82; text-align:center;"|Best Actress in a Supporting Role
|-
! ! style="background:#efac00; text-align:center;"|Tamil
! ! style="background:#efeb00; text-align:center;"|Telugu
|-
| valign="top" |
Saranya Ponvannan – Neerparavai
Viji Chandrasekhar – AarohanamNandita Das – NeerparavaiRadhika Apte – DhoniUrmila Mahanta – Vazhakku Enn 18/9| valign="top" |
Saloni – Bodyguard
Sindhu Tolani – IshqSuhasini Maniratnam – Gabbar SinghAmala – Life Is BeautifulBhanupriya – Dhammu|-
! ! style="background:#00def3; text-align:center;"| Kannada
! ! style="background:#4df300; text-align:center;"| Malayalam
|-
|
Nidhi Subbaiah – Anna Bond
Rekha Vedavyas – Govindaya NamahaSindhu Lokanath – DramaUmashree – Bheema TheeradalliMalavika Avinash – Munjane| 
Swetha Menon – Ozhimuri
Thesni Khan – Trivandrum LodgeLena – Ee Adutha KalathuSamvrutha Sunil – Diamond NecklaceMallika – Ozhimuri|-
! colspan="2" ! style="background:#eedd82; text-align:center;"|Best Actor in a Negative Role
|-
! ! style="background:#efac00; text-align:center;"|Tamil
! ! style="background:#efeb00; text-align:center;"|Telugu
|-
| valign="top" |
Vidyut Jamwal – Thuppakki
Narain – MugamoodiSachin Khedekar – MaattrraanSudhanshu Pandey – Billa IIAshutosh Rana – Vettai| valign="top" |
Sudeep – Eega
Nassar – DhammuAbhimanyu Singh – Gabbar SinghSonu Sood – JulaiPrakash Raj – Businessman|-
! ! style="background:#00def3; text-align:center;"| Kannada
! ! style="background:#4df300; text-align:center;"| Malayalam
|-
|
Pooja Gandhi – Dandupalya
P. Ravi Shankar– ShaktiRavi Kale – Kalaya Tasmai NamahaSharath Lohitashwa – Bheema TheeradalliMakarand Deshpande – Dandupalya| 
Prathap K. Pothan – 22 Female Kottayam
Murali Gopy – Ee Adutha KaalathuMakarand Deshpande – No. 66 Madhura BusKishore – Thiruvambadi ThampanAsif Ali – Unnam|-
! colspan="2" ! style="background:#eedd82; text-align:center;"|Best Comedian
|-
! ! style="background:#efac00; text-align:center;"|Tamil
! ! style="background:#efeb00; text-align:center;"|Telugu
|-
| valign="top" |
Thambi Ramaiah – Kumki
Santhanam – Oru Kal Oru KannadiSoori – SundarapandianJayaram – ThuppakkiVTV Ganesh – Podaa Podi| valign="top" |
Sreenu – Gabbar Singh
Posani Krishna Murali – Krishnam Vande JagadgurumBharath – Dhenikaina ReadyBrahmanandam – JulaiAli – Ishq|-
! ! style="background:#00def3; text-align:center;"| Kannada
! ! style="background:#4df300; text-align:center;"| Malayalam
|-
|
Sadhu Kokila – Yaare Koogadali
Sathish Ninasam – DramaKomal Kumar – Govindaya NamahaRangayana Raghu – ShivaTabla Nani – Rambo| 
Suraj Venjaramood – Mr. Marumakan
Biju Menon – OrdinaryBaburaj – MayamohiniSalim Kumar – Ayalum Njanum ThammilManoj K. Jayan – Mallu Singh|}

 Music 

{| class="wikitable" |
|-
! colspan="2" ! style="background:#eedd82; width:3000px; text-align:center;"|Best Music Director
|-
! ! style="background:#efac00; width:50%; text-align:center;"|Tamil
! ! style="background:#efeb00; text-align:center;"|Telugu
|-
| valign="top" |
Harris Jayaraj – Thuppakki
Vijay Antony – NaanD. Imman – KumkiAnirudh Ravichander – 3Ilaiyaraaja – Neethane En Ponvasantham| valign="top" |
Devi Sri Prasad – Gabbar Singh
Devi Sri Prasad – JulaiM. M. Keeravani – EegaS. Thaman – BusinessmanMani Sharma – Racha|-
! ! style="background:#00def3; text-align:center;"| Kannada
! ! style="background:#4df300; text-align:center;"| Malayalam
|-
|
Arjun Janya – Romeo
V. Harikrishna – Anna BondGurukiran – Govindaya NamahaA. R. Rahman – GodfatherAnoop Seelin – Sidlingu| 
Shaan Rahman – Thattathin Marayathu
Gopi Sundar – Ustad HotelOuseppachan – Ayalum Njanum ThammilShahabaz Aman – SpiritVidyasagar – Diamond Necklace|-
! colspan="2" ! style="background:#eedd82; text-align:center;"|Best Lyricist
|-
! ! style="background:#efac00; text-align:center;"|Tamil
! ! style="background:#efeb00; text-align:center;"|Telugu
|-
| valign="top" |
Dhanush – "Kannazhaga" from 3
Na. Muthukumar – "Oru Paathi" from ThaandavamVairamuthu – "Para Para" from NeerparavaiYugabharathi – "Sollitaley" from KumkiMadhan Karky – "Aska Laska" from Nanban| valign="top" |
Bhaskarabhatla Ravikumar – "Sir Osthara" from Businessman
Vanamali – "Amma Ani Kothaga" from Life Is BeautifulDevi Sri Prasad – "O Madhu" from JulaiRamajogayya Sastry – "Ga Ee Ga Ee Ga Ee" from EegaSirivennela Sitaramasastri – "Jaruguthunnaadi" from Krishnam Vande Jagadgurum|-
! ! style="background:#00def3; text-align:center;"| Kannada
! ! style="background:#4df300; text-align:center;"| Malayalam
|-
|
A. P. Arjun  – "Ammate" from Addhuri
Jayant Kaikini – "Yenendu Hesaridali" from Anna BondPawan Wadeyar – "Pyarge Agbittaite" from Govindaya NamahaKaviraj – "Nee Odi Bandaga" from ShivaYogaraj Bhat – "Bombe Aadsonu" from Drama| 
Anu Elizabeth Jose – "Muthuchippi Poloru" from Thattathin Marayathu
Kaithapram – "Rajagopuram" from Puthiya TheerangalKavalam Narayana Panicker – "Andalonde" from Ivan MegharoopanSarath Vayalar – "Azhalinte" from Ayalum Njanum ThammilRafeeq Ahammed – "Mazha Kondu" from Spirit|-
! colspan="2" ! style="background:#eedd82; text-align:center;"|Best Male Playback Singer
|-
! ! style="background:#efac00; text-align:center;"|Tamil
! ! style="background:#efeb00; text-align:center;"|Telugu
|-
| valign="top" |
Dhanush – "Why This Kolaveri Di" from 3
Haricharan – "Ayyayayo" from KumkiMohit Chauhan – "Po Nee Po" from 3Vijay – "Google Google" from ThuppakkiG. V. Prakash Kumar – "Para Para" from Neerparavai| valign="top" |
S. Thaman – "Sir Osthara" from Businessman
Adnan Sami – "O Madhu" from JulaiShankar Mahadevan – "Akasam Ammayaithe" from Gabbar SinghS. P. Balasubrahmanyam – "Jaruguthunnaadi" from Krishnam Vande JagadgurumVedala Hemachandra – "Oka Padam" from Racha|-
! ! style="background:#00def3; text-align:center;"| Kannada
! ! style="background:#4df300; text-align:center;"| Malayalam
|-
|
V. Harikrishna – "Tumba Nodbedi" from Anna Bond
Tippu – "Boni Aagada" from Anna BondBaba Sehgal – "Nee Odi Bandaga" from ShivaVijay Prakash – "Thund Haikla Sahavasa" from DramaArjun Janya – "Mane Tanka Bare" from Rambo| 
Vijay Yesudas – "Mazha Kondu" from Spirit
Mohanlal – "Attumanal" from Run Baby RunK. J. Yesudas – "Ee Chillayil" from SpiritVineeth Sreenivasan – "Anuragathin" from Thattathin MarayathuHaricharan – "Mizhikalum" from Padmasree Bharat Dr. Saroj Kumar|-
! colspan="2" ! style="background:#eedd82; text-align:center;"|Best Female Playback Singer
|-
! ! style="background:#efac00; text-align:center;"|Tamil
! ! style="background:#efeb00; text-align:center;"|Telugu
|-
| valign="top" |
Saindhavi – "Uyirin Uyire" from Thaandavam
Shruti Haasan – "Kannazhaga" from 3Shreya Ghoshal – "Solittaley" from KumkiShreya Ghoshal – "Vilayatta Padagotty" from DhoniShreya Ghoshal – "Chinna Kanniley" from Dhoni'Shweta Mohan – "Nee Partha Vizhigal" from 3
| valign="top" |Geetha Madhuri – "Melikalu" from Cameraman Gangatho RambabuShreya Ghoshal – "Sai Andri Nanu Sai Antira" from Krishnam Vande Jagadgurum
Mamta Sharma – "Kevvu Keka" from Gabbar Singh
Malathi – "Orinayano" from Rebel
Suchitra – "Sir Osthara" from Businessman
|-
! ! style="background:#00def3; text-align:center;"| Kannada
! ! style="background:#4df300; text-align:center;"| Malayalam
|-
|Vani Harikrishna – "Mussanje Veleli" from AddhuriIndu Nagaraj – "Pyarge Aagbittaite" from Govindaya Namaha
Anuradha Bhat – "Ellelo Oduva" from Sidlingu
Shreya Ghoshal – "Gamanava" from Chingari
Mamta Sharma – "Hello 123" from Yaare Koogadali
| Remya Nambeesan – "Andalonde" from Ivan Megharoopan'Shweta Mohan – "Shyam Hare" from ArikeShreya Ghoshal – "Nilave Nilave" from ChattakkariMamta Mohandas – "Iravil Viriyum" from ArikeAnna Katharina Valayil – "Appangalembadum" from Ustad Hotel|}

 Choreography 

 Debutant awards 

 Generation Next Awards 

Pride of South Indian Cinema – Asin
Youth Icon of South Indian Cinema – Kajal Aggarwal
Stylish Actress of South Indian Cinema – Shruti Haasan
Rising Star of South Indian Cinema (female) – Nitya Menen
Rising Star of South Indian Cinema (male) – Nivin Pauly
Romantic Star of South Indian Cinema – Diganth
Sensational Music Director – Anirudh
Sensational Debut of the Year – Udhayanidhi Stalin
Sensation Innovative Marketing – 3''

References

External links 
 

South Indian International Movie Awards
2012 Indian film awards